The Cathedral of the Descent of the Holy Spirit  also called Greek Catholic Cathedral of the Descent of the Holy Spirit is the name given to a Catholic religious building of the Romanian or Byzantine rite that serves as the seat of the Eparchy of Lugoj (Eparchia Lugosiensis or Eparhia Lugoj) which was created in 1853 with the Bull "Apostolicum ministerium" of Pope Pius IX is located in Lugoj, originally in the Austrian Empire and now in Romania.

The building was built between 1843-1854 in neoclassical style by architect L. Oettinger. The cathedral was occupied by force by members of the Romanian Orthodox Church during the Communist period from 1948 to 1990 and returned to Catholic hands on 21 January 1990 by decision of the Orthodox Metropolitan Nicolae Corneanu, the first Greek Catholic cathedral returned to its original owners in the country.

See also
Roman Catholicism in Romania
Holy Spirit Cathedral
List of cathedrals in Romania

References

Greek-Catholic cathedrals in Romania
Buildings and structures in Lugoj
Roman Catholic churches completed in 1854
1853 establishments in the Austrian Empire
19th-century Roman Catholic church buildings in Romania